Bashirabad (also Romanized as Bashīrābād; also known as Shīrābād) is a village in Gavrud Rural District, in the Central District of Sonqor County, Kermanshah Province, Iran. At the 2006 census, its population was 509, in 112 families.

References 

Populated places in Sonqor County